The McMullen Mac Airliner was a late 1920s American light airliner powered by a Liberty L-12 V-12 engine of  World War I origin. The sole prototype was destroyed in a hangar fire.

Design and development

The Mac Airliner was designed as a fast carrier of mail and passengers, its cost lowered by the use of the old but readily available Liberty L-12 engine, produced in large numbers late in World War I. It was a shoulder wing, strut braced monoplane based on steel tube structures.

Its wings used a M-6 airfoil combining high lift and low drag. They were braced from the lower fuselage by pairs of parallel struts to the wing-spars at about 60% span, encased in airfoil section fairings and adding to the wings' lift. Its ailerons were beyond the bracing struts.

The Mac's upright Liberty engine was nose-mounted with its radiator below it. From nose to tail the fuselage was flat-sided apart from rounded decking. The pilot's enclosed cabin was at the leading edge with windowed access doors below. Separate rectangular windows under the wing lit the passengers' cabin. The fuselage tapered to the rear, where the tailplane was mounted on top and braced to a cropped triangular fin that carried a rounded balanced rudder.

Its oleo strut legs were mounted on the forward wing struts at points strengthened by struts to the upper fuselage. Its tail wheel was hydraulically damped.

The date of the Mac's first flight is not known but by mid-April 1929 it was being prepared for a flight to an airshow in Chicago. The sole example was destroyed in a hangar fire at Tampa on 12 December 1929.

Specifications

References

Single-engined tractor aircraft
Shoulder-wing aircraft
1920s United States airliners